Yanique Haye-Smith (born March 22, 1990) is a Jamaican born Turks and Caicos islander track and field athlete specializing in the 400 metres hurdles. Haye-Smith represented Jamaica until November 2018, when she switched allegiance to Turks and Caicos. She represented Turks and Caicos at the 2019 World Athletics Championships. Haye-Smith competed for Lincoln University in Jefferson City, Missouri .

In 2022, Haye-Smith also competed at the 2022 World Athletics Indoor Championships – Women's 400 metres in Belgrade, Serbia.

Personal records
 200 meters – 23.42 (-0.4), (Montverde, Florida 2018)
 400 metres – 52.25 (Montverde, Florida 2018)
 400 metres hurdles – 55.58 (Montverde, Florida 2019) NR
Indoor
 60 metres – 7.63 (Virginia Beach 2021) NR NR
 200 metres – 23.71 (Boston 2019) NR
 400 metres – 52.72 (Boston 2019) NR

References

External links
World Athleitcs Bio

1990 births
Living people
Jamaican female hurdlers
Turks and Caicos Islands athletes